The Port of Ashuganj is a notable river port in eastern Bangladesh. It is one of the important industrial ports of the Bengal delta. It is located on the Meghna River. The port is a regional transshipment center in Eastern South Asia.

Location
The port is located 28 km from Brahmanbaria town and 43 km from the Akhaura land border between Bangladesh and India.

Facilities
The port is located in an industrial area in the vicinity of the Ashuganj Power Station, a 1777 megawatt thermal power plant which is one of the largest in Bangladesh. The port is also the terminal for a large fertilizer and chemical plant; as well as smaller power plants. The port hosts several warehouses and shipyards. Its industrial units receive gas supplies from the nearby Titas Gas field.

Container terminal
A container terminal is under-construction in Ashuganj, but as of July 2017, the project has been delayed due to land disputes.

Transshipment
Ashuganj port acts as a port of call for cargo shipments to the nearby Indian state of Tripura. Cargo unloaded in Ashuganj port is transported by road to the Akhaura-Agartala land border; and vice versa. The transshipment route allows access for several Indian states, including Mizoram, Manipur, Nagaland and Lower Assam.

See also
 Port of Chittagong

References

Ashuganj
Ashuganj
Organisations based in Ashuganj